487th may refer to:

487th Air Expeditionary Wing, provisional United States Air Force unit assigned to the United States Air Forces in Europe
487th Bombardment Squadron, inactive United States Air Force unit
487th Fighter Squadron, inactive United States Air Force unit

See also
487 (number)
487, the year 487 (CDLXXXVII) of the Julian calendar
487 BC